Fudo-ike is an earthfill dam located in Fukuoka Prefecture in Japan. The dam is used for irrigation. The catchment area of the dam is  km2. The dam impounds about 2  ha of land when full and can store 230 thousand cubic meters of water. The construction of the dam was completed in 1936.

References

Dams in Fukuoka Prefecture
1936 establishments in Japan